The Harris Hip Score was developed by William H. Harris to assess the results of hip surgery or hip replacement. The standard evaluation applies to various hip disabilities and methods of treatment in adults. The original version of the score was first published in 1969.

References 

Orthopedic clinical prediction rules